The Arkansas Razorbacks softball team represents the University of Arkansas in NCAA Division I college softball. The team participates in the Western Division of the Southeastern Conference (SEC). The Lady Razorbacks are currently led by head coach Courtney Deifel. The team plays its home games at Bogle Park located on the university's campus.

Head coaches

Championships

Conference Championships

Conference Tournament Championships

Arkansas Razorbacks Louisville Slugger/NFCA All-Americans

Awards and honors

Conference awards
SEC Freshman of the Year
Devon Wallace (2012)

SEC Pitcher of the Year
Mary Haff (2021)
Chenise Delce (2022)

See also
List of NCAA Division I softball programs

References

External links